The men's 20 kilometres race walk at the 1966 European Athletics Championships was held in Budapest, Hungary, on 30 August 1966.

Medalists

Results

Final
30 August

Participation
According to an unofficial count, 27 athletes from 13 countries participated in the event.

 (1)
 (2)
 (1)
 (3)
 (2)
 (3)
 (1)
 (1)
 (3)
 (3)
 (3)
 (3)
 (1)

References

20 kilometres race walk
Racewalking at the European Athletics Championships